A Million Wild Acres: 200 years of man and an Australian forest is a non-fiction book written by Eric Charles Rolls (1923–2007). It was first published in Melbourne by Thomas Nelson in 1981.

A Million Wild Acres is not just a regional history of what is now known as the Pilliga forest, but also a history of European settlement in Australia.

Contents
 Explorers and Livestock: Setting up the Board
 The First Moves: A Difficult Game
 The Squatters: The Rules are Ignored
 Licences to Depasture Beyond the Limits: A New Game to New Rules
 Runholders and Selectors: The Rules are Modified
 The Forest Takes Over: The Game Ends
 The Breelong Blacks: A Sinister Comedy
 Timber and Scrub
 Timbergetters and Scrub Dwellers: A Different Game
 Mud Springs and Soda Plains
 Animal Life: Insects, Reptiles and Others
 Animal Life: The Mammals
 The Animals: The Birds
 Wood Chips and International Airports: A Businessmen's Game

Reception 
The book won The Age Book of the Year (1981), C.J. Dennis Prize and Talking Book of the Year.

Notes and references

https://www.abc.net.au/radionational/programs/the-history-listen/eric-rolls-and-the-pilliga/10594212

Watermark Literary Society https://web.archive.org/web/20110219162616/http://www.watermarkliterarysociety.asn.au/

Wyndham, Susan. Author Rolls dies aged 84 Sydney Morning Herald 02/11/2007 

Hanley, Penelope. Creative lives: personal papers of Australian writers and artists

Mosman Readers: Eric Rolls - A Million Wild Acres 26/01/2009 

Rolls later qualified this book's debated overall position on Australian tree densities and land clearing.

Footnotes

What lies beyond us? The literature of landscape http://www.abc.net.au/radionational/programs/bigideas/what-lies-beyond-us3f3a-the-litertaure-of-landscape/5853552

1981 non-fiction books
Australian non-fiction books
Books about Australian history
Environmental history